Nanbanzuke or nanban-zuke (Japanese: 南蛮漬け, literally "southern barbarian pickle (marinade)") is a Japanese fish dish. To prepare it, the fish (often Japanese jack mackerel or wakasagi smelt) is fried and then marinated in a mixture of vinegar, carrots, sugar, and chili peppers.  It bears a close resemblance to escabeche and is believed to have been brought to Japan by the Portuguese (Southern Barbarians) in the 16th century.

See also
Marinade
Escabeche

References
 
 
 
 

Fish dishes
Japanese cuisine

ja:から揚げ#南蛮漬け